Prosopocera gassneri is a species of beetle in the family Cerambycidae. It was described by Stephan von Breuning in 1936. It is known from the Democratic Republic of the Congo, Gabon, and Cameroon.

References

Prosopocerini
Beetles described in 1936